Tropojë is a municipality in Kukës County, northeastern Albania, within the historical ethnographic region of the Gjakova Highlands. The municipality consists of the administrative units of Bajram Curri, Bujan, Bytyç, Fierzë, Lekbibaj, Llugaj, Margegaj and Tropojë, that became municipal units. The seat of the municipality is the town Bajram Curri. As of the Institute of Statistics estimate from the 2011 census, there were 4,117 people residing in the municipal unit Tropojë and 20,517 in Tropojë Municipality.

Etymology

Tropojë's old name was Trebopolje and is recorded in Serbian medieval charters and Ottoman registers. The word itself comes from the old Slavic trebiti, ‘to clean’, and polje, ‘field’, i.e. ‘clean field’. Tropojë used to be more commonly known as Malësia e Gjakoves.

History 

The region was inhabited by Illyrian tribes. Archaeological evidence found in the area, such as castles or tumuli show that the area was populated since the ancient time. The region lies in the geographical span of the Dardani tribes.

Geography 

Tropojë Municipality is located on the bank of Valbonë River between the Albanian Alps in northeastern Albania bordering Montenegro to the northwest and Kosovo to the northeast and east. Valbonë Valley National Park sprawls in the northwest of Tropojë and protects the Valbonë Valley and the Gashi River, which has been inscribed on the UNESCO World Heritage list as portion of the Ancient and Primeval Beech Forests of the Carpathians and Other Regions of Europe.

Climate 

Notable people 
Albana Osmani
Azem Hajdari
Besnik Mustafaj
Binak Alia
Erjon Dollapi
Fatime Sokoli
Haxhi Zeka
Mic Sokoli
Sali Berisha
Shpend Dragobia
Skënder Gega
Soni Malaj

Notes

References

External links 

tropoje.gov.al – Official Website 

 
Administrative units of Tropojë
Albanian ethnographic regions
Gegëri
Municipalities in Kukës County
Towns in Albania